Japan Breeding farms' Cup Sprint (ジャパンブリーディングファームズカップスプリント) is an annual race held on "JBC day", which is usually November 3, or the national holiday Culture Day.  This race and the JBC Classic were started in 2001. These were established following the American Breeders' Cup.

The winner of 2007, Fujino Wave, is the only JBC champion horse belonging to NAR, the organization supervising horseracing administrated by the local government. Others belong to the JRA.

This is the one of the highest-prized sprint races. Although JBC Classic tends to be regarded as preparatory for Japan Cup Dirt, this race occupies the position as "dirt sprint championship". That is why there is no grade I sprint or mile race until February Stakes in the next year.

JBC races are held on various tracks, so its distance is changed yearly like the JBC Classic. For details, see the table below.
It will be held at the Kawasaki Racecourse in 2012.

Winners 

This race was held as JBC Mile.

Open sprint category horse races
Horse races in Japan
Dirt races in Japan